Georg Somloi (born 16 March 1960) is an Austrian fencer. He competed in the individual and team foil events at the 1984 Summer Olympics.

References

1960 births
Living people
Austrian male fencers
Austrian sabre fencers
Olympic fencers of Austria
Fencers at the 1984 Summer Olympics